Hòa Bình is a ward located in Biên Hòa city of Đồng Nai province, Vietnam. It has an area of about 0.5km2 and the population in 2017 was 10,320.

References

Bien Hoa